Mordellistena nanuloides is a species of beetle in the genus Mordellistena of the family Mordellidae, which is part of the superfamily Tenebrionoidea. It was discovered in 1967.

References

Beetles described in 1967
nanuloides
Endemic fauna of the Netherlands